Telolecithal (Greek: τέλος (telos) = end, λέκιθος (lekithos) = yolk), refers to the uneven distribution of yolk in the cytoplasm of ova found in birds, reptiles, fish, and monotremes. The yolk is concentrated at one pole of the egg separate from the developing embryo.

This type of egg undergoes discoidal meroblastic cleavage, where yolk is not incorporated in the cells during cell division.

See also
Centrolecithal
Isolecithal

References
Early Development in Fish
Early Development in Birds

Animal developmental biology